I Can See You may refer to:
 I Can See You (EP), an EP released by the American band Black Flag
 I Can See You (film), a 2008 American film written and directed by Graham Reznick
 I Can See You (TV series), a Philippine TV series broadcast by GMA Network